Portknockie (the hilly port) is a coastal village on the Moray Firth within Moray, Scotland.

The village's name is written as Portknockies in the Old Parish Registers. This would suggest that the port's name referred to not one, but two rocky hills at the hythe - the Port Hill and the Greencastle. Nearby towns include Buckie, Findochty and Cullen.

Historically in Banffshire, the village was founded in 1677 and it became a significant herring fishing port during the nineteenth century, although today only a handful of commercial inshore boats remain.

The town was on the railway network, until Portknockie station closed in 1968.

A popular site in Portknockie is Bow Fiddle Rock, a large rock about 50 feet high just off the coast. The quartzite structure has a large sea arch, which somewhat resembles the bow of a fiddle, making it an example of a natural arch.

Small numbers of seabirds nest on the coastal cliffs.  These include fulmar, black-legged kittiwake, common gull, razorbill and shag.  Additionally common eider can be seen in and around the harbour and coves during the summer months.

Notable residents

Prof Alexander Mair FRSE (1912-1995) was born and raised in the village and is buried there with his parents.
Norman Calder, Great British Bake Off Series 5 contestant.

Green Castle Fort
Another historical site within the village is the Green Castle, which is located on a coastal promontory.

This ancient coastal fort was revealed to date from 1000 BC and was inhabited until 1000 AD.The castle foundations can be seen, although now covered in grass.

References

External links

Villages in Moray
Buckie
Ports and harbours of Scotland
Populated places established in 1677
1677 establishments in Scotland